1. FC Slovácko is a Czech football club based in Uherské Hradiště. The team was established in 1927 as SK Staré Město and on 1 July 2000 as 1. FC Synot, which was a merger of the original club with FC Slovácká Slavia Uherské Hradiště. Since 2009 the club has played in the Czech First League. Slovácko have won one Czech Cup, and reached the cup final a further two times.

History
Established in 1927 as SK Staré Město, the club played exclusively in the lower levels of Czechoslovak and later Czech football.

Staré Město won the Moravian–Silesian Football League in the 1996–97 season and were promoted to the Czech 2. Liga in 1997. The club won promotion from the Czech 2. Liga in 2000, clinching promotion five matches before the end of the season. This marked the start of the club's first-ever spell in the country's top flight. The club merged with Slovácká Slavia Uherské Hradiště in 2000, the resultant club becoming 1. FC Synot. During the club's first seasons in the Czech First League, they took part in European competition a number of times, playing in the UEFA Intertoto Cup on three occasions. In the summer of 2004, the club officially changed its name to 1. FC Slovácko. Slovácko reached the final of the 2004–05 Czech Cup, losing 2–1 to winners Baník Ostrava.

The club played for seven years in the Czech First League before being relegated in 2007. The club went on to play two years in the second division, being promoted despite finishing 10th in the 2008–09 Czech 2. Liga, as second-placed side that season, Čáslav, sold Slovácko their license for the top flight. The same season, the club again reached the final of the Czech Cup, losing the final of the 2008–09 Czech Cup to Teplice.

In the 2021/22 season, the club finished in 4th place on 68 points ahead of FC Banik Ostrava in 5th. They also won the Czech Cup for the first time in the club's history after defeating Sparta Prague 3–1 with goals from Václav Jurečka and Petr Reinberk who scored twice, and qualified for the UEFA Europa League.

Historical names 

 1927–1948: SK Staré Město
 1948–1953: Sokol Staré Město
 1953–1993: Jiskra Staré Město
 1993: SFK Staré Město
 1994–1999: FC Synot Staré Město
 1999–2000: FC Synot
 2000–2004: 1. FC Synot (after merger with Slovácká Slavia Uherské Hradiště)
 2004–present: 1. FC Slovácko

Players

Current squad

Out on loan

Notable former players

Reserves
As of 2021–22, the club's reserve team 1. FC Slovácko B plays in the Moravian-Silesian Football League (3rd tier of Czech football system).

Player records in the Czech First League
.
Highlighted players are in the current squad.

Most appearances

Most goals

Most clean sheets

Managers

František Komňacký (1997–2001)
Dušan Radolský (2001–2002)
Milan Bokša (2002)
Radek Rabušic (2002–2003)
Karel Jarolím (July 2003 – June 2005)
Ladislav Molnár (Dec 2004 – Nov 2005)
Stanislav Levý (Nov 2005 – June 2006)
Jiří Plíšek (June – Nov 2006)
Pavel Malura (Nov 2006 – Jan 2008)
Leoš Kalvoda (Jan – July 2008)
Ladislav Jurkemik (July – Dec 2008)
Josef Mazura (Dec 2008 – Dec 2009)
Miroslav Soukup (Jan 2010 – Aug 2012)
Svatopluk Habanec (Aug 2012 – May 2016)
Stanislav Levý (June 2016 – Sep 2017)
Michal Kordula (Sep 2017 – Nov 2018)
Martin Svědík (Nov 2018 – present)

History in domestic competitions

 Seasons spent at Level 1 of the football league system: 19
 Seasons spent at Level 2 of the football league system: 5
 Seasons spent at Level 3 of the football league system: 4

Czech Republic

Notes:
† Twelve points were taken off from Slovácko as a result of proven corruption.

Honours
Czech Cup 
Winners: 2021–22
Runners-up: 2004–05, 2008–09

Czech 2. Liga
 Winners: 1999–2000

Moravian–Silesian Football League
 Winners: 1996–97

European record

Club records

Czech First League records
Best position: 4th (2020–21, 2021–22)
Worst position: 16th (2006–07)
Biggest home win: Slovácko 5–0 Plzeň (2000–01), Slovácko 5–0 Hradec Králové (2002–03), Slovácko 5–0 Brno (2013–14)
Biggest away win: Příbram 0–4 Slovácko (2011–12), Teplice 0–4 Slovácko (2012–13)
Biggest home defeat: Slovácko 0–4 Ostrava (2001–02), Slovácko 0–4 Zlín (2018–19)
Biggest away defeat: Brno 7–0 Slovácko (2010–11)

References

External links
 

 
Slovacko
Association football clubs established in 1927
Czech First League clubs